The list of ship launches in 1978 includes a chronological list of all ships launched in 1978.


References

Sources

1978
Ship launches